"War" is a single by Bone Thugs-n-Harmony, released in 1998. It was featured on Small Soldiers and on the 1998 collection album The Collection Volume One. The song is performed by members Layzie, Flesh, and Wish, and also features Henry Rollins, Tom Morello and Flea.

The song interpolates the chorus of Edwin Starr's 1970 song of the same name.

References

1998 singles
Bone Thugs-n-Harmony songs
1998 songs
Ruthless Records singles
Song articles with missing songwriters